Dvin (also Romanized as Dvīn) is a village in Howmeh Rural District, in the Central District of Shirvan County, North Khorasan Province, Iran. At the 2006 census, its population was 1,310, in 412 families.

References 

Populated places in Shirvan County